St James School is a coeducational private day and boarding school located in Grimsby, North East Lincolnshire, England. It comprises a Nursery School, Preparatory School, Senior School and Sixth Form. The school is associated with the Church of England Grimsby Minster, dedicated to St James.

History

Formerly known as St James Choir School, the school was founded on the premises of Grimsby's parish church, St James's (now known as Grimsby Minster). Canon James Peter Young, curate and later vicar at the church, was influenced by Nathaniel Woodard's education philosophy and established the school in 1880 to educate the church's choirboys. Classes were initially held in the Church's "Aqua Rooms", which became unsuitable. In 1882 the school became St James's College, with the intention of continuing to educate the boys after they outgrew the choir. The original choir school moved to a new site before reuniting with the college in 1904. A pre-preparatory department was added in 1957 and a sixth form and boarding programme two years later. It became an associated Woodard School in 1968 and was incorporated in 1985.

Girls were first admitted in 1973 and accepted as boarders two years later. In 1975 "choir" was dropped from the school’s name, as it had now expanded to educate many other pupils, and choristers were a minority. Since 2014, the school has no longer educated the Minster's Choristers, who are now drawn from eleven different schools, and open to all.

Boarding
Boarding pupils at St. James are housed within Woodard House, a purpose built boarding facility opposite the main school campus. The boarding programme is available to pupils in Year 3 and above.

Notable Old Jacobeans
Walter Bertram Wood (1898–1917), First World War flying ace

References

Further reading
Cowie, Leonard & Evelyn (1991). That One Idea: Nathaniel Woodard and His Schools. Ellesmere, Shropshire: Woodard Corporation; pp. 139–42: St James' School, Grimsby

External links
School website
Profile on the ISC website

Choir schools in England
Schools in Grimsby
Private schools in the Borough of North East Lincolnshire
Member schools of the Independent Schools Association (UK)
Boarding schools in Lincolnshire
Woodard Schools
Church of England private schools in the Diocese of Lincoln